Aleksey Vdovin (17 June 1963 – 22 July 2022) was a Russian  water polo player who competed in the 1992 Summer Olympics.

See also
 List of Olympic medalists in water polo (men)
 List of world champions in men's water polo
 List of World Aquatics Championships medalists in water polo

References

External links
 

1963 births
2022 deaths
Sportspeople from Penza
Soviet male water polo players
Russian male water polo players
Olympic water polo players of the Unified Team
Water polo players at the 1992 Summer Olympics
Olympic bronze medalists for the Unified Team
Olympic medalists in water polo
Medalists at the 1992 Summer Olympics